The opisthosoma is the posterior part of the body in some arthropods, behind the prosoma (cephalothorax). It is a distinctive feature of the subphylum Chelicerata (arachnids, horseshoe crabs and others). Although it is similar in most respects to an abdomen (and is often referred to as such), the opisthosoma is differentiated by its inclusion of the respiratory organs (book lungs or book gills) and the heart.

Segments
The number of segments and appendages on the opisthosoma vary. Scorpions have 13, but the first is only seen during its embryological development. Other arachnids have fewer; harvestmen, for instance, have only ten. In general, appendages are absent or reduced, although in horseshoe crabs they persist as large plate-like limbs, called opercula or branchiophores, bearing the book gills, and that function in locomotion and gas exchange. In most chelicerates the opisthosomal limbs are greatly reduced and persist only as specialized structures, such as the silk-producing spinnerets of spiders or the pectines of scorpions. In animals like whip scorpions and whip spiders the first two 'sternites' bearing the book lungs may actually be highly modified opisthosomal limbs.
Segmentation of the opisthosoma in adult spiders is not visible, but embryo spiders typically have 13 segments, the posterior segments being called the presegmental zone.

References

Chelicerate anatomy

pl:Odwłok